The Sternorrhyncha suborder of the Hemiptera contains the aphids, whiteflies, and scale insects, groups which were traditionally included in the now-obsolete order "Homoptera". "Sternorrhyncha" refers to the rearward position of the mouthparts relative to the head.

Distributed worldwide, all members of this group are plant-feeders, many considered pests feeding on major crops and ornamental plants.

Many exhibit modified morphology and/or life cycles, including phenomena such as flightless morphs, parthenogenesis, sexual dimorphism, and  eusociality.

Phylogeny
The phylogeny of the extant Sternorrhyncha, inferred from analysis of small subunit (18S) ribosomal RNA, is shown in the cladogram.

The evolutionary position of several fossil taxa are unclear. A suggested phylogeny is:

Groups
Well-known groups in the Sternorrhyncha include:

 aphids – (Aphididae)
 woolly and gall-making aphids (Eriosomatinae)
 pine and spruce aphids (Adelgidae)
 phylloxerans (Phylloxeridae, including the vine phylloxera)
 whiteflies – (Aleyrodidae)
 jumping plant lice (Psyllidae and allied families)
 Superfamily Coccoidea (scale insects)
 cottony cushion scales, giant coccids, and ground pearls (Margarodidae)
 armoured scales (Diaspididae)
 cochineal insects (Dactylopiidae)
 lac scales (Kerriidae, Lacciferidae, Tachardinidae)
 soft scales (Coccidae)
 pit scales (Asterolecaniidae)
 mealybugs (Pseudococcidae)
 felted scales (Eriococcidae)

References

External links

 Suborder Sternorrhyncha—Plant-parasitic Hemipterans at BugGuide

 
Insect suborders